Christopher Faulknor (born 12 November 1962) is a Jamaican sprinter. He competed in the men's 4 × 100 metres relay at the 1988 Summer Olympics.

References

1962 births
Living people
Athletes (track and field) at the 1988 Summer Olympics
Jamaican male sprinters
Olympic athletes of Jamaica
Place of birth missing (living people)